Friedrich von Keller may refer to:

Friedrich von Keller (painter) (1840–1914), German genre painter
Friedrich von Keller (diplomat) (1873–1960), German diplomat

See also
Friedrich Keller (disambiguation)